San Gorgonio is Spanish for "Saint Gorgonius";

San Gorgonio might also refer to:

Landforms and parks
San Gorgonio Mountain, California, United States
San Gorgonio Pass, California, United States
San Gorgonio River, California, United States
San Gorgonio Wilderness, California, United States

Establishments and organizations
San Gorgonio Council, of Girl Scouts
San Gorgonio course, a golf course at Sun City Palm Desert, California
San Gorgonio High School, in San Bernardino, California
San Gorgonio Inn, in Banning, California
San Gorgonio Memorial Hospital, in Banning, California
San Gorgonio Memorial Park, cemetery in Banning, California
San Gorgonio Pass Campus, a satellite campus of Mt. San Jacinto College
San Gorgonio Pass Wind Farm, located on the eastern slope of the San Gorgonio Pass
San Gorgonio Wilderness Association, works to support the San Gorgonio Wilderness

Historical
San Gorgonio, an early name for Beaumont, California
San Gorgonio Handicap, previous name of the Robert J. Frankel Stakes American horse race
San Gorgonio Unified School District, defunct; divided into Beaumont and Banning Unified School Districts

See also
 
 

Rancho San Gorgonio (disambiguation)